The Chester train wreck occurred on August 31, 1893, outside of Chester, Massachusetts. A bridge collapse plunged four train cars into the Westfield River, killing 14 people. An investigation by Massachusetts Railroad Commission found that the bridge had been weakened by a maintenance crew that had removed rivets from the bridge.

Bridge
The wreck occurred on a 221-foot long, two-span iron lattice truss bridge that crossed over the Westfield River. The bridge had been built in 1874 and was in the process of being strengthened for larger locomotives. Crews were working that day and were on break at the time of the accident.

Accident
Around 12:30 pm, the bridge collapsed under the weight of the Boston and Albany Railroad’s Chicago limited express. The train's locomotive made it over the bridge, but was smashed. The buffet car, two sleeping cars, and the dining car plunged 20 feet into the water and shattered upon impact. The two day coaches and the smoking car in the rear of the train remained on the track. Although the accident occurred in a fairly isolated area, a man driving by on horse observed the wreck and rode into the village for help. Hundreds soon rushed to the scene including a physician, George L. Wood, who treated the injured with the help of the train's porters in a nearby apple orchard. They were then moved to nearby houses before being transported to hospitals in Springfield, Massachusetts via a two-horse wagon filled with hay and covered in blankets. 13 bodies, many of them horribly mutilated, were pulled from the wreck. A fourteenth victim died three days later.

Investigation
The Massachusetts Railroad Commission launched an inquiry into the accident. The commission heard testimony from four expert witnesses, all who testified that the bridge could have held the weight of the train under normal conditions, however the bridge had weakened the bridge by 50% when the work crew removed the rivets from the connector plate on the top chord of the south truss and neglected to secure it with bolts or draft pins and failed to bolt the new plates in place at the end post.

An inquest overseen by Judge Homer B. Stevens of the Western Hampden District Court in Westfield, Massachusetts placed the blame on J. D. Reed and Daniel Belville, the supervisors of the crew working on the bridge. Stevens criticized Reed for not giving Belville specific instructions and Belville, who was not a knowledgeable or qualified bridge builder, for not personally inspecting the work before he and his crew left.

References

1893 in Massachusetts
August 1893 events
Bridge disasters in the United States
Bridge disasters caused by maintenance error
Chester, Massachusetts
Railway accidents in 1893
Railway accidents and incidents in Massachusetts